Harry Leonard Cooper,  (born 20 February 1944), is an Australian veterinarian and television personality who is best known for his media appearances.

Career
Harry Cooper graduated with second class honours from Sydney University’s Faculty of Veterinary Science in December 1965, at age 21. He practised for several years across Sydney and the UK before his burgeoning media career became a full-time commitment. Harry Cooper began his media career in a veterinary segment on a morning TV talk show in Sydney.  Later he became known as the resident veterinary surgeon on the long-running series Burke's Backyard.  In 1993, he hosted his first series, Talk to the Animals and then, in 1997, the veterinary series Harry's Practice, which was cancelled in 2003 despite consistently high ratings. Cooper currently presents a veterinary segment on the lifestyle program Better Homes and Gardens.  He is also an animal welfare advocate and public speaker.

Personal life
It was revealed that Cooper had been diagnosed with prostate cancer in late 2007; after more than six months of treatment, he is in remission and continuing his work role on TV.

Cooper believes Australia should become a republic.

In March 2012, he revealed that he had separated from Janine Morganti, his wife of 26 years. Cooper has three children and five grandchildren.

He married long time partner Sue Sheean in 2022 on their property on the Mid North Coast of NSW.

References

External links
 
 Better Homes and Gardens page
 Dr Harry Cooper's hobby farm
 Australia's most popular vet, Dr Harry Cooper :: ABC Tasmania
 Dr Harry Cooper Bio :: Better Homes and Gardens

Living people
Australian television presenters
Australian veterinarians
Male veterinarians
Australian republicans
1943 births
Recipients of the Medal of the Order of Australia